Iverkala is a rural village in Kollam district of Kerala state in India. The famous Kallada river flows through the village from east and south. On the other side of the river, Attuvassery is in the east and Thekkumchery is in the south. West side Kadampanadu and North Mannady.

Etymology 

There is no historical evidence for the formation of the name. Iver means "five persons" and kala means "place". Locals believe that the five Pandava brothers of epic Mahabharata lived in this place.

Economy 
The economy is mainly dependent upon agriculture but now most of the paddy fields are abandoned by farmers due to the shortage of workers as the new generation is not engaging in the agriculture field because of the low return. Educated youths seek government jobs or overseas jobs which are more profitable.

Environmental problems 

Much of the local land has been converted from vegetable farming to rubber estates so inhabitants of this area is gradually becoming dependent on other states for food items. The village does contain some brick factories and two (in Pakistan Mukku and Kaleekkalazhikathu Mukku) cashew-processing factory, however. Sand mining from Kallada river was one source of income but this is totally controlled by authorities due to environmental problems. Now large-scale un-authorised mining proceeds with the support of corrupted panchayath, police, and RT officials.

Attuvassery is a village in Kottarakkara taluk, Vettikkavala block, near Tekkumcheri and Mavadi. Kattakkuzhi and Kalathattu are beautiful parts of Attuvassery.

History
Attuvassery, the land lying in the mouth (va) of Kalladayar, so as it call as Attuvacheri, then it changed to Attuvassery. Another mythological story was based on Mahabharatha. Noottavar was staying here once up on a time, then the land called as Noottuvassery, which again changed to Attuvassery. However, now the village known as Attuvassery.

Iverkala the name indicate 'IVER', Pandavas were lived in river bank during the 'Vanavasa' period. "Attuvassey Kalathattu", an ancient resting place of travellers, is historically known since this Kalathattu had given refuge to Raja Raja Sree Marthanda Varma, while he was being chased by his rivals in Thiruvithamkoor. The fable is that he had played Chathurangam with villagers here who did not identify the Maharaja.

Land
Land in Attuvassery is fertile and has many fields and agricultural land.

Temples
Attuvassery has two temples on it. Both are very old temples about 1500 years old. Both have vigraha that are very powerful. The villagers give respect to both.
Dharma Sasthavu is the main prethishttah in Dharma Sastha Kshethram.
The administration of temple is under N.S.S.
Rudhira Bhayankari Khshetram
Kaalee devi is the main prethishttah in this temple. A Kaavu is located near the temple. This temple has a pond located in front of it.
Kichapallil Devi Temple, Thrikodeshwaram Shiva temple are the oldest temples in this region. These temples are more than 1000 years old. The new Vishnu temple at Thetumudi is a reconstruction of an old temple that was ruined years ago. Bhranikkave Devi temple and Karthikeya temple and Ganapatiyam Mugal Ganapati Temple are other centre of attraction and worship.

Agriculture

Till some years ago people in Attuvassery cultivated paddy in the fields. But people now mostly depend upon rubber and banana plants. 73% of the people in Attuvassery have rubber on their property, 18% cultivate bananas, and 9%, vegetables.

Transportation
People in Attuvassery depend mainly on private vehicles and autorickshaws.

Industry
There are two brick companies in Attuvassery. Again one brick factory will uplift in Attuvassery's land soon.

Educational institutions

There is only one school in Attuvassery. It is S.V.N.S.S.U.P.S. It offers L.K.G to 7. All classes in this school get computer training. About 275 students are studying in this school. (97% people who live in Attuvassery studied in this school.) The school's administration is under N.S.S. Karayogam.

Changanassery Smaraka Granthasala is one of the oldest libraries in Iverkal, dating from the 19th century.

There are two schools located at Kichakapallli. The primary school run by Government and Upper Primary school run by NSS Karayogam. Students from these villages attend Shasthamkotta College or Pandalam College for their higher studies.

References

Villages in Kollam district